The 1956 South Dakota State Jackrabbits football team was an American football team that represented South Dakota State University in the North Central Conference during the 1956 NCAA College Division football season. In its tenth season under head coach Ralph Ginn, the team compiled a 4–5 record, finished in a tie for fourth place out of seven teams in the NCC, and was outscored by a total of 212 to 137.

Schedule

References

South Dakota State
South Dakota State Jackrabbits football seasons
South Dakota State Jackrabbits football